Cabrera's hutia (Mesocapromys angelcabrerai) is a small, critically endangered, rat-like mammal found only in Cuba. It lives in communal shelters in swamps and coastal mangrove forests, and is threatened by habitat loss. It is a member of the hutia subfamily (Capromyinae), a group of rodents native to the Caribbean that are mostly endangered or extinct.

Its species name angelcabrerai is in honour of Spanish zoologist Ángel Cabrera.

References

Hutias
Mesocapromys
Mammals of Cuba
Hutia
Mammals described in 1979
Taxonomy articles created by Polbot
Endemic fauna of Cuba